James William Moulder (March 28, 1921, Burgin, Kentucky – May 6, 2011, Vernon Hills, Illinois) was an American microbiologist.

Biography
Moulder graduated from the University of Chicago with a bachelor's degree in 1941 and a Ph.D. in biochemistry in 1944. From 1944 to 1945 he was a research associate in malaria at an Office of Scientific Research and Development project in Chicago. In the early part of his career he did research on the biochemistry and immunology of Plasmodium and Trypanosoma. At the University of Chicago he was an instructor from 1946 to 1947 and was appointed to an assistant professorship in 1947. He was eventually promoted to a full professorship and retired as professor emeritus in 1986. At the University of Chicago he chaired the department of bacteriology and parasitology and, later, the department of microbiology. From 1957 to 1968 he was the co-editor-in-chief or editor-in-chief of the Journal of Infectious Diseases.

For the academic year 1952–1953, Moulder was a Guggenheim Fellow. From 1952 to 1953 he was a senior Fulbright scholar at the University of Oxford, UK. In 1954 he received the Eli Lilly and Company-Elanco Research Award. In 1999 he received the Bergey Medal.

After retiring from the University of Chicago, Moulder and his wife moved to Tucson, Arizona. Until 1998 he advised students and faculty in the University of Arizona's department of microbiology and immunology.

He and his wife had three daughters and a son. He was predeceased by his wife and two of his daughters. Upon his death he was survived by one daughter, one son and five grandchildren.

Selected publications

Articles
 
 
 
 
 
  (1st edition, 1988)

Books and monographs

References

External links
 

1921 births
2011 deaths
20th-century American biochemists
American bacteriologists
American microbiologists
American parasitologists
University of Chicago alumni
University of Chicago faculty
People from Mercer County, Kentucky